The 1991–92 season was the 93rd season for FC Barcelona.

Summary
The season is best remembered for the club's first-ever European Cup triumph, beating Sampdoria at Wembley Stadium with a score of 1–0 after extra time through a free-kick goal by Ronald Koeman. 

In La Liga Barcelona had a poor start, losing 3 of their first 8 games, but the tide began to turn as Barcelona experienced a brilliant run, losing only 3 of their next 30 games. Going into the final matchday, Barcelona trailed Real Madrid by a point. Real Madrid lost to CD Tenerife 2–3, but Barcelona won their final game, securing a second consecutive title for the Catalonian club.

Players

First-team squad
Squad at end of season

Transfers

Winter

Left club during season

Reserve squad

Results

Supercopa de España

La Liga

League table

Results by round

Matches 

Source:Competitive Matches

Copa del Rey

Eightfinals

European Cup

First round

Second round

Group stage

Group B

Final

Friendlies

Statistics

Appearances and goals

Notes

External links

webdelcule.com

References

FC Barcelona seasons
UEFA Champions League-winning seasons
Barcelona
1991-92